Loup Hervieu (born 5 April 2000) is a French professional footballer who plays as a midfielder for Belgian National Division 1 club Mandel United.

Career
A youth product of Caen, Hervieu signed his first professional contract with the club on 28 May 2019. He made his professional debut with in 1–0 Ligue 2 win over Ajaccio on 29 August 2020.

On 12 January 2022, Hervieu signed for Belgian club Mandel United.

References

External links
 

2000 births
Living people
People from Granville, Manche
French footballers
Association football midfielders
US Granville players
Stade Malherbe Caen players
Royal FC Mandel United players
Championnat National 3 players
Championnat National 2 players
Ligue 2 players
French expatriate footballers
Expatriate footballers in Belgium
French expatriate sportspeople in Belgium
Sportspeople from Manche
Footballers from Normandy